Falls Creek is a small town south of Nowra, New South Wales in the Shoalhaven. It is situated on the Princes Highway.

References

http://www.abc.net.au/news/2009-04-03/two-seriously-hurt-in-highway-crash/1640286
http://falls-creek-nsw.post-code.net.au/
http://www.everytrail.com/browse.php?activity_id=6&city=Falls+Creek&country=Australia&state=New+South+Wales

City of Shoalhaven